The Chaco National Park is a national park of Argentina, located in the province of Chaco. It has an area of 150 km2. It was created in 1954 in order to protect a sample of the Eastern Chaco, composed mainly of warm lowlands, with an annual summer rainfall between 750 and 1,300 mm.

This park is a protected area for the quebracho trees. Forests of quebracho colorado chaqueño (Schinopsis balansae) were once located in the north of Santa Fe and the western half of Chaco, and had entered the northeast region of the province of Corrientes. Its strong wood and its abundant tannin caused it to be over-exploited for a century.

The area harbors several environments: scrubland, savanna, swamps, and small lakes. The scrubland is the habitat of the red quebracho (Schinopsis lorentzii), white quebracho (Aspidosperma quebracho-blanco),  algarrobo (Prosopis alba), and lapacho (Tabebuia spp.),  all of which are commercially valuable species. The fauna includes large predators such as cougars. In the lakes one finds yacare caimans and capybaras. Elsewhere there are armadillos, South American tapirs and plains viscachas, as well as birds (more than 340 species). The fauna also includes the black howler monkey (Alouatta caraya).

Indigenous communities of the Mocoví and Toba peoples are found in the protected area.

See also 
 Campo del Cielo

References
Administración de Parques Nacionales - Argentina's National Park Administration (in Spanish)

National parks of Argentina
Protected areas of Chaco Province
Protected areas established in 1954
Humid Chaco